The 1984 Berlin Marathon was the 11th running of the annual marathon race held in Berlin, West Germany, held on 30 September. Sweden's John Skovbjerg won the men's race in 2:13:35 hours, while the women's race was won by Hungary's Ágnes Sipka in 2:39:32. Sweden's Bo Lindquist (2:16:32) and West Germany's Gabriele Beyer (2:47:14), won the men's and women's wheelchair races. A total of 7297 runners finished the race, comprising 6875 men and 422 women.

Results

Men

Women

Wheelchair men

Wheelchair women

References 

 Results. Association of Road Racing Statisticians. Retrieved 2020-06-20.
 Berlin Marathon results archive. Berlin Marathon. Retrieved 2020-06-20.

External links 
 Official website

1984
Berlin Marathon
1980s in West Berlin
Berlin Marathon
Berlin Marathon